Zmiiv Raion was a raion (district) in Kharkiv Oblast of Ukraine. Its administrative center was the town of Zmiiv. The raion was abolished on 18 July 2020 as part of the administrative reform of Ukraine, which reduced the number of raions of Kharkiv Oblast to seven. The area of Zmiiv Raion was, together with Pechenihy and Vovchansk Raions, merged into Chuhuiv Raion. The last estimate of the raion population was  

At the time of disestablishment, the raion consisted of two hromada: 
 Slobozhanske settlement hromada with the administration in the urban-type settlement of Slobozhanske;
 Zmiiv urban hromada with the administration in Zmiiv.

References

Chuhuiv Raion
Former raions of Kharkiv Oblast
1922 establishments in Ukraine
Ukrainian raions abolished during the 2020 administrative reform